Gokavaram is a village in Gokavaram mandal, East Godavari district in the state of Andhra Pradesh in India.

Geography
It has an average elevation of 45 meters (150 feet).

References 

Villages in Gokavaram mandal